In demonology, Halphas (listed in Skinner & Rankine's edition as Malthas, and in the Crowley/Mathers edition as Halphas, Malthus, or Malphas) is the thirty-eighth demon in the Ars Goetia in the Lesser Key of Solomon (forty-third in Johann Weyer's Pseudomonarchia Daemonum), ranked as an earl.

Most manuscripts describe Halphas as a hoarse-voiced stock dove (though Weyer and Collin de Plancy's Dictionnaire Infernal describe him as a stork), who supplies weapons and ammunition for towers (Weyer and de Plancy have "towns" or "villes" instead), sends men to war, and commands 26 legions of spirits.

According to Skinner & Rankine, Halphas is opposed by the Shemhamphorasch angel Haamiah.

See also 

Goetia

References

Sources

 

Goetic demons